Gymnopilus zenkeri is a species of agaric fungus in the family Hymenogastraceae. Originally described by German mycologist Paul Christoph Hennings in 1901 as Pholiota zenkeri, it was transferred to  the genus Gymnopilus by Rolf Singer in 1951. The fungus is found in Africa.

See also
List of Gymnopilus species

References

Fungi described in 1901
Fungi of Africa
zenkeri